To The Nines is the first album by melodic hardcore band Only Crime. It was released by Fat Wreck Chords on July 13, 2004, and features Good Riddance's Russ Rankin, Bane's Aaron Dalbec, and renowned drummer and producer, Bill Stevenson, of Black Flag and Descendents fame. It also features Doni and Zach Blair, brothers who made up half the band Hagfish.

Track listing
All music written by Only Crime, all lyrics by Russ Rankin
 "R.J.R." – 2:04
 "Sedated" – 2:32
 "Doomsday Breach" – 2:08
 "Pray for Me" – 2:36
 "To the Nines" – 2:57
 "Real Enemy" – 2:24
 "Tenebrae" – 2:23
 "Virus" – 2:37
 "The Well" – 2:36
 "On Time" – 3:10
 "Fallen Idols" – 2:41

Credits
 Russ Rankin – vocals
 Zach Blair – guitar
 Aaron Dalbec – guitar
 Doni Blair – bass
 Bill Stevenson – drums
 Recorded in February, 2004 at The Blasting Room, Fort Collins, Colorado
 Produced, engineered, mixed, and mastered by Bill Stevenson and Jason Livermore
 Additional engineering by Andrew Berlin and Brian Kephart

External links
Only Crime official website
Fat Wreck Chords, record label
Good Riddance official website
Bane official website
Bill Stevenson's official website

Only Crime albums
2004 debut albums
Fat Wreck Chords albums
Albums produced by Bill Stevenson (musician)